JOY Entertainment is a Vietnamese mobile game company oriented to become a full-fledged mobile game developer and publisher.
This game company was founded on April 21, 2012 by four young founders with previous experiences about game making at Gameloft SEA – Le Giang Anh, Tran Quang Huy, Hoang Ngoc Toan, and Nguyen Huu Le Trong Tin.

In early times, company made simple casual games such as Auto Racing: Upstream, Amazing Kick, Troll Running, Blocks Buddies, and Kupid to train basic and advanced skills for developers. In 2014, they shipped their breakthrough hit Captain Strike that attracted over 3 million users.

History

JOY Entertainment was founded on April 21, 2012 by four game developers in HCMC small office.

2012–2013 
 Company started their activities with the original idea being develop casual games to cultivate more experience. And embark on making their first game, Kupid.

2013–2014 
 This company completed Kupid - a simple casual game. This is considered the product marks the start up, and also the motivation for making the next games.
 Next, company was continues developing new games Blocks Buddies and Bounce on iOS operating system of the iPhone, iPod Touch and iPad on August 15, 2013.

2014–2015 
 Continuous released three quality game: Troll Running. , Auto Racing. , Amazing Kick.
 Change location of office to Mekong Tower Building
 Implementation and completion of breakthrough game, Captain Strike

2015–2016 
 Captain Strike game title is exported to foreign countries with the transfer contract for a publisher in Thailand.
 Won the 1st prize in the Asia Incubate contest Camp in Singapore with the idea of mobile game Clash of Allstars. 
 Continue with important projects: Clash of Allstars and Dream Life.

Products

Developed games

Technology 
In the process of developing game, they have created an engine to serve for their work named JAB Engine. This is the first engine developed by Vietnam. This engine has the salient features.

Copyright 
On June 5, 2015 they completed the registration of the Captain Strike brand product with code number 2013/2015/QTG.

Awards 
February 26, 2015 A mobile game product under the name of Clash of Allstars have topped the competition in Asia Incubate Camp organized by Incubate Fund (Japan).

References

External links

Mobile game companies
Video game companies of Vietnam
Video game companies established in 2012
Vietnamese companies established in 2012